Queen Myeongui of the Jeongju Yu clan (d. 8 August 1112) was a Korean queen consort as the first and primary wife of King Sukjong of Goryeo and the mother of most of his children.

Biography

Marriage and Palace life
She married Sukjong when he was still Duke Gyerim (계림공). Before 1079, she was given royal title as Princess Myeongbok (명복궁주, 明福宮主) while live in Myeongbok Palace and later changed into Princess Yeondeok (연덕궁주, 延德宮主) when she moved to Yeondeok Palace. Her mother, Lady Gim was formally called as "Grand Lady of the Nakrang State" (낙랑국대부인, 樂浪國大夫人).

Then, following her husband who ascended the throne as a King, she become a Queen Consort in 1099. But, in Goryeosa, there was some misunderstood because her name after become a queen consort, her clan name was written as Yi clan (이씨, 李氏) which this wasn't her clan.

However, on 10 November 1105, her husband passed away and their oldest son, Wang U ascended the throne as Yejong of Goryeo those making Yu honoured both of Queen Mother (태후, 太后) and Grand Queen Mother (왕태후, 王太后) in 1105. Beside Yejong, she bore Sukjong 6 other sons and 4 daughters. After that, she was given Sungmyeong Mansion (숭명부, 崇明府) in Cheonhwa Hall (천화전, 天和殿) as her residence and affiliated institution. As a queen mother, her birthday was also specially celebrated.

Later life

Death
On 8 August 1112, the queen mother caught an illness and died suddenly after went to recuperation outside the palace at her old age in Sinbak Temple. On 8th month (Lunar calendar) in the same year, she was buried in Sungneung Tomb (숭릉, 崇陵) and received her Posthumous name.

Funeral
During her funeral, the Liao dynasty sent their envoys to mourn. But, seeing this, the internal court said:

("임금님, 쟤네들이 태후님 제사 지내러 온 건 이번이 처음 아닌가요? 인국(隣國)이 이런 예우(禮)를 보여준걸 축하드립니다!").

Posthumous name
In 1140 (18th year reign of King Injong), name Yu-ga (유가, 柔嘉) was added.
In October 1253 (40th year reign of King Gojong), name Gwang-hye (광혜, 光惠) was added to her Posthumous name too.

References

External links
Queen Myeongui on Encykorea .
Queen Myeongui on Goryeosa .
명의왕후 on Doosan Encyclopedia .

Royal consorts of the Goryeo Dynasty
Korean queens consort
1112 deaths
12th-century Korean women
12th-century Korean people
Year of birth unknown